is a Japanese judoka and mixed martial artist. He was a world-class judo competitor with 5 top-3 Judo World Cup tournament finishes and has won multiple silver and bronze medals at world and national judo competitions. Most recently, he's competed in MMA and currently has an MMA record of 8 wins, 3 losses and 1 draw. He won the Spirit MC Heavyweight Grand Prix tournament in 2007.

Judo career
Murata has achieved good success as a judoka. He was second at the world junior championships in 1996. In Japanese national tournaments he has been second once (2000) and third twice (1998,2001). At World Cup events he won in Tbilisi (2003) and Budapest (2001), finished second at Leonding, Austria (1997), and third in Paris (2000).

Mixed martial arts career
Ryuichi Murata made his MMA debut on Pride Fighting Championships Bushido 8 card in 2005. He lost the fight against Kazuki Okubo due to submission. In a post fight interview, Murata stated that he didn't have enough experience to fight well in MMA and didn't feel like he was "able to show much at all" of what he wanted to achieve.

Murata went on to fight on a number of cards with the Deep and Spirit MC MMA promotions. In 2007, he participated in Spirit MC's Heavyweight GP tournament. In the first round he knocked out Dong Woo Shin. He later submitted ChunGil Myung Chun with an armbar to move to the tournament finals. In the finals he earned a technical knockout against Jung Gyu Choi to become Spirit MC's Heavyweight GP Champion.

Judo tournaments

Mixed martial arts record

|-
| Loss
| align=center| 8-3-1
| Jae Young Kim
| KO (punches and knees)
| Spirit MC 17
| 
| align=center| 1
| align=center| 0:33
| Seoul, South Korea
| 
|-
| Win
| align=center| 8-2-1
| Seung Bae Whi
| Decision (unanimous)
| Spirit MC 16
| 
| align=center| 3
| align=center| 5:00
| Seoul, South Korea
| 
|-
| Win
| align=center| 7-2-1
| Ho Jin Kim
| Submission (armbar)
| Deep: Protect Impact 2007
| 
| align=center| 1
| align=center| 3:38
| Osaka, Japan
| 
|-
| Win
| align=center| 6-2-1
| Jung Gyu Choi
| TKO (punches)
| Spirit MC 13
| 
| align=center| 3
| align=center| 3:34
| Seoul, South Korea
| Heavyweight Grand Prix final
|-
| Win
| align=center| 5-2-1
| Gil Myung Chun
| Submission (keylock)
| Spirit MC 13
| 
| align=center| 1
| align=center| 3:29
| Seoul, South Korea
| Heavyweight Grand Prix semi-final
|-
| Win
| align=center| 4-2-1
| Dong Woo Shin
| KO (punch)
| Spirit MC 12
| 
| align=center| 1
| align=center| 2:18
| Seoul, South Korea
| Heavyweight Grand Prix quarter-final
|-
| Draw
| align=center| 3-2-1
| Sojiro Orui
| Draw
| Deep: 31 Impact
| 
| align=center| 2
| align=center| 5:00
| Tokyo, Japan
| 
|-
| Win
| align=center| 3-2
| Gregory Babene
| TKO (punches)
| Real Rhythm - 5th Stage
| 
| align=center| 1
| align=center| 3:36
| Osaka, Japan
| 
|-
| Win
| align=center| 2-2
| Seiki Ryo
| Decision (unanimous)
| Deep: clubDeep Nagoya: MB3z Impact, Di Entrare
| 
| align=center| 2
| align=center| 5:00
| Nagoya
| 
|-
| Loss
| align=center| 1-2
| Nick Ring
| Decision (unanimous)
| Deep: 23 Impact
| 
| align=center| 2
| align=center| 5:00
| Tokyo, Japan
| 
|-
| Win
| align=center| 1-1
| Ryuhei Sato
| TKO (punches)
| Deep: 21st Impact
| 
| align=center| 1
| align=center| 3:51
| Tokyo, Japan
| 
|-
| Loss
| align=center| 0-1
| Kazuki Okubo
| Submission (armbar)
| Pride: Bushido 8
| 
| align=center| 1
| align=center| 4:29
| Nagoya, Aichi, Japan
| MMA Debut

References

External links
 
 

Living people
1976 births
Japanese male mixed martial artists
Middleweight mixed martial artists
Light heavyweight mixed martial artists
Heavyweight mixed martial artists
Mixed martial artists utilizing judo
Japanese male judoka